The Nord 1100 Noralpha was a French-built and re-engined Messerschmitt Bf 108 produced by Nord Aviation.

Development
Construction of the Messerschmitt Bf 108 was transferred to the Société Nationale de Constructions Aéronautiques du Nord (usually known simply as Nord) at Les Mureaux, to the West of Paris, in occupied France in 1942. The company built two prototypes of the Messerschmitt Me 208 during 1943/44. One survived the liberation and was redesignated Nord 1100.

The company then produced a re-engined version of the Nord Pingouin with a Renault 6Q-10 engine as the Nord 1101. The 1101 was designated the Ramier by the French military. One Nord 1104 Noralpha was fitted with a  Potez 6D-0 for trials and two earlier 1101 Noralphas were converted with a Turbomeca Astazou II turboshaft engine as the S.F.E.R.M.A.-Nord 1100 Noralpha (S.F.E.R.M.A. - Société Française d'Entretien et de Réparation de Matériel Aéronautique) in 1959.

Design
The Noralpha was a low-wing cantilever monoplane with a braced horizontal tail surface and single rudder. It had a retractable tricycle landing gear. The engine was nose-mounted and it had an enclosed cabin with side-by-side seating for two and room behind for a further two passengers.

Operational history

Nord built 200 production examples of the Noralpha and these served as communications aircraft with the French Air Force and French Navy. Later, many examples were civilianised. The final Air Force Noralphas were replaced in service with the Centre d'essais en vol (CEV) at Bretigny-sur-Orge during 1974-75, whilst a few naval examples continued for a further brief period.

Variants
1100
2x French-built Me 208 prototypes, powered by a single  Argus As 10C-1 engine.
1101 Noralpha / Ramier I
 Renault 6Q-10 (right-hand turning) powered production variant. 205 were built for civil and French military use where the 1101 was known as the Nord 1101 Ramier I (English: Woodpigeon I).
1102 Noralpha / Ramier II
 Renault 6Q-11 (left-hand turning) powered variant, not built. French military use where the 1101 was known as the Ramier I (English: Woodpigeon II).
1104 Noralpha
One trials aircraft powered by a  Potez 6D-0 engine.
S.F.E.R.M.A.-Nord 1110 Nord-Astazou
Two conversions by S.F.E.R.M.A. (Société Française d'Entretien et de Réparation de Matériel Aéronautique) in 1959, each with a single  Turbomeca Astazou II turboprop engine.

Operators

Armée de l'Air (ALA)
Aviation Légère de l’Armée de Terre (ALAT)
Aéronavale

Specifications (1101 Noralpha)

See also

References

Notes

Bibliography
 
 

1940s French military utility aircraft
Noralpha
Single-engined tractor aircraft
Low-wing aircraft
Aircraft first flown in 1944